401 Squadron "Cientistas" was an aerial reconnaissance, photography and maritime patrol squadron of the Portuguese Air Force disbanded in 2011. The squadron also conducted counter-narcotic operations, monitoring of marine pollution in the Portuguese exclusive economic zone, and natural resource surveying.

Roles and missions 
The primary mission of 401 Squadron was aerial reconnaissance and photography. It had as its secondary missions the support of electronic warfare, maritime patrol, and search and rescue.

The squadron also performed medical evacuations in the archipelagos of Madeira and Azores, and surveillance against narcotic trafficking, illegal fishing, and pollution. Additionally, it provided support to national agencies and institutions by conducting mineral and energy exploration surveys.

History 
The origin of 401 Squadron dates back to the creation of the Transport and Liaison Squadron in 1966, based at Air Base No. 1 (BA1), which performed aerial photography tasks. That same year, the squadron used a Wild RC8 vertical metric camera to perform the first aerial survey in Portugal.

In 1975 the squadron started operating the C-212-100 fitted with RC10 cameras and geophysical survey equipment.

In 1979 the squadron's designation and name were changed to Reconnaissance Squadron and later in 1984 the squadron was assigned the maritime patrol mission.

In 1991 the squadron was added to the fishing activity control, inspection and surveillance integrated system's (SIFICAP) command and in 1995 started operational flights with the C-212-300 equipped for maritime patrol and fisheries protection.

Its aircraft's equipment was upgraded in 1993, with the acquisition of Leica Geosystems RC30 cameras and GPS equipment.

The squadron was re-designated as 401 Squadron in 1995, for the last time, and was assigned the search and rescue mission.

In 2008 the squadron was assigned all the missions of 502 Squadron, which was transitioning from the CASA C-212 to the then entering service EADS CASA C-295 aircraft, and in May 2009, was relocated from BA1 to Air Base No. 6.

On December 6, 2011, a ceremony took place at BA6 signaling the disbandment of the squadron. 502 Squadron was then assigned 401 Sqn.'s original aerial reconnaissance, maritime patrol, and fishery protection missions.

Lineage 
 Constituted as Esquadra de Ligação e Transporte (Transport and Liaison Squadron) in 1966
 Re-designated as Esquadra de Ligação e Fotografia (Photography and Liaison Squadron) in 1973
 Re-designated as Esquadra de Reconhecimento e Pesquisa de Recursos (Resource Research and Reconnaissance Squadron) in 1974
 Re-designated as Esquadra de Reconhecimento (Reconnaissance Squadron) in 1979
 Re-designated as Esquadra 401 (401 Squadron) in 1995
 Disbanded on December 6, 2011

Aircraft 
 Beechcraft Model 18 (1966–1975)
 Douglas C-47 Dakota (1974–1976)
 CASA C-212-100 Aviocar (1975–2011)
 CASA C-212-300 Aviocar (1994–2011)

See also 
 Portuguese Air Force
 List of aircraft of the Portuguese Air Force
 502 Squadron
 503 Squadron
 711 Squadron
 Aerial survey
 Imagery intelligence
 Photogrammetry
 Fishing in Portugal
 Prestige oil spill
 Jakob Maersk oil spill

References

Bibliography 
 
 

Portuguese Air Force aircraft squadrons
Military units and formations established in 1966
Military units and formations disestablished in 2011